Fieldia may refer to a number of different genera in various scientific fields:

Botany
Fieldia (plant) A. Cunningham, 1825, a genus of plants in the family Gesneriaceae. Fieldia is also used as a common name for Fieldia australis, a species in this genus 
Fieldia Gaudichaud, 1829, a synonym of the orchid genus Vandopsis

Zoology
Fieldia K. Johnson, 1991, a synonym of Calycopis a genus of butterfly in the family Lycaenidae
Fieldia Niculescu, 1979, a synonym of Vanessa (butterfly)

Paleontology
Fieldia (worm) Walcott, 1912, a genus of worms in the family Fieldiidae